MV Ali Cat is a motor catamaran passenger ferry owned by Caledonian Maritime Assets Limited and operated by Caledonian MacBrayne, which along with  provides a service from Dunoon to Gourock across the Firth of Clyde.

History
MV Ali Cat was built in 2000 for Solent & Wightline Cruises, who chartered her to Blue Funnel Group. They in turn chartered her to Caledonian MacBrayne for the Dunoon to Gourock service. She entered service on 21 October 2002 to run at peak times, carrying up to 250 passengers. The run had previously been served at peak times by two car ferries, one of which went down the Firth of Clyde at quieter times to assist on the Rothesay to Wemyss Bay service which only had a 90-minute service at peak times. Introduction of the Ali Cat for the winter 2002-03 timetable met morning and evening commuter demand on the Dunoon run, releasing the peak period car ferry to improve the Rothesay service. At first the catamaran had occasional difficulties with winter weather making embarking at Dunoon hazardous and leading to cancellations. The service was subsequently extended to cover summer timetables, and construction of a breakwater in 2004 overcame the problems at Dunoon pier.

From 30 June 2011, the Dunoon to Gourock crossing became a passenger-only service operated by Argyll Ferries Ltd (a sister company to Caledonian MacBrayne). Ali Cat was purchased outright and continues to ply the route.

Layout

Ali Cat is a motor catamaran. A bar serves the covered accommodation, and passengers can also use the open upper deck.

Service
MV Ali Cat provides a passenger-only service between Gourock and Dunoon. At special weekends in the past she has supplemented the CalMac Rothesay service.

Following the withdrawal of the Caledonian MacBrayne Gourock-Dunoon vehicle service on 29 June 2011, Ali Cat formed part of the new contract for the passenger-only service on this route, operated by Argyll Ferries Ltd and using the new pier at Dunoon. As well as being repainted in Argyll Ferries livery, a fold-down ramp was added at the stern, enabling foot passenger use of the linkspan vehicle ramps at both ferry terminals. 

From 21 January 2019 the Argyll Ferries service was transferred by Transport Scotland into the existing Caledonian MacBrayne Clyde and Hebrides Ferry Service contract, and from 12 November 2019 Ali Cat was seen in CalMac livery.

Footnotes

Caledonian MacBrayne
1999 ships